Aisin Gioro Shuose (； 17 January 1629 - 12 January 1655) was Hong Taiji's fifth son and the first bearer of the Prince Chengze title. In 1655, the peerage was renamed to Prince Zhuang of the First Rank. In 1778, the Prince Chengze of the First Rank peerage was granted iron-cap status, which meant that each successive bearer could pass the title without degradation.

Life

Family background 
Shuose was born on 17 January 1629 in the Qingning palace of the  Forbidden City in Mukden, residence of Qing dynasty emperor at that time. His mother, lady Yehe-Nara was a secondary consort of Hong Taiji. Lady Yehe Nara's father, Anabu (阿纳布) was a cousin of Yangginu, the father of Empress Xiaocigao, Monggo Jerjer. Before entry to the imperial household, lady Yehe Nara had been married to Karkama, a leader of Ula valley. After giving birth to Shuose, lady Yehe Nara married minister Zhan Tuxietu. Lady Yehe Nara became a victim of domestic violence shortly after the marriage. The fairly abusive behavior of Zhan Tuxietu led her to the fourth marriage with Darhu (达尔琥), a member of the Hada Nara clan of the Bordered Yellow Banner. Shuose was raised in the Qingning palace together with Bomubogor and Fulin, the future Shunzhi Emperor.

Political career 
Although Shuose was born to the high-ranking consort, he had no chances to succeed the throne. In June 1644, Shuose married lady Nara, daughter of Feiyanggu and was subsequently granted a title of Prince Chengze of the Second Rank. During transition from Ming to Qing, Shuose followed Dodo, Prince Yu in Shaanzhou. In 1645, he conquered Henan together with Dodo. He captured Li Zicheng's generals Zhang Youseng and Liu Fangliang, later retrieved by the peasant . In the battle of Shanhai Pass, Shuose killed Ma Shiyao (马世尧). When Dodo made Khalkha Mongols vassals, Shuose conquered Datong together with Ajige.

After the death of Dorgon, Shuose was promoted to Prince Chengze of the First Rank in 1651 and served as one of the regents together with Wakeda, Daišan's son and Prince Qian of the Second Rank. Shuose died on 12 January 1655 and was posthumously honoured as Prince Chengzeyu of the First Rank (承澤裕親王, meaning "blessed and abundant"). His successor became eldest son Boguoduo.

Estate 
The estate of Prince Zhuang of the First Rank totaled 78.000 mu scattered over 25 counties in Zhili, 4.000 mu in Zhangjiakou and Chengde, 71.000 mu in Liaoning and pasturelands totaling 324.000 mu in Shanxi, which constituted 5.5% of taxable arable land for the empire in 1887. Before the demise of the Qing dynasty, the estate had totaled 550.000 mu despite 8 times of division.

Family 

Primary Consort

 First primary consort, of the Nara clan 
 Princess Heshun of the Second Rank (8 October 1648 – January 1692), second daughter
 Married Shang Kexi's son Shang Zhilong in 1660
 Boguoduo, Prince Zhuangjing of the First Rank (22 April 1650 – 15 February 1723), first son
 Bo'erguoluo, Prince Hui of the Second Rank (博尔果洛; 13 December 1651 – 26 March 1712), second son

 Second primary consort, of the Khorchin Borjigin clan, daughter of Manzhuxili

Secondary Consort

 Secondary consort, of the Khorchin Borjigin clan (d. May/June 1655), daughter of Dalai (达赉)

Concubine

 Mistress, of an unknown clan
 Enggebu, General Wenxi of the Second Rank (三等温僖辅国将军 鞥额布; 21 July 1652 – 3 April 1681), third son

 Mistress, of the Erdosu clan (鄂爾鐸蘇氏)
 Suiha (随哈; 11 December 1654 – 23 April 1657), fourth son

References 

Qing dynasty imperial princes 
Prince Zhuang
Hong Taiji's sons